Igor Gennadyevich Gmyza (born January 12, 1965, Minsk) is a Russian radio and TV presenter. In 1995–2004 he was the host of the news program on the Public Russian Television (ORT, now Channel One). From 2006 to 2016 he was a political commentator on Radio Rossii. Currently, he is a teacher at the Higher school of television of Moscow State University.

He is married and has a son Nikita.

References

External links
 Ток-шоу Игоря Гмызы «Особое мнение»
 That Does Not Get Into the News — there

1965 births
Living people
Russian television presenters
People from Minsk
Radio and television announcers
Soviet male stage actors
Russian radio personalities
Russian people of Belarusian descent
Academic staff of Moscow State University
Russian male journalists